Jesús Claudio Baldaccini (born 12 December 1986) is an Argentinian footballer. His last clubwas Hapoel Jerusalem.

References
 
 

1986 births
Living people
Argentine footballers
Argentine expatriate footballers
Gimnasia y Esgrima de Mendoza footballers
Unión San Felipe footballers
Hapoel Jerusalem F.C. players
Primera B de Chile players
Liga Leumit players
Expatriate footballers in Chile
Expatriate footballers in Argentina
Association football forwards
Sportspeople from Mendoza, Argentina